Hay River Water Aerodrome  is located  northeast of Hay River, Northwest Territories, Canada. It is open from the middle of May until October.

See also
 Hay River/Merlyn Carter Airport
 Hay River/Brabant Lodge Water Aerodrome

References

Registered aerodromes in the South Slave Region
Seaplane bases in the Northwest Territories